The Victorian Women's Amateur Championship is the state amateur golf championship of Victoria, Australia. It has been played annually since 1900, except for the war years.

Format
The event is a match play tournament. In 2021 and 2022 there were 16 qualifiers, the championship being played over two days with all matches over 18 holes. In 2020 the number of qualifiers was reduced to 8. Before 2020 there were 16 qualifiers with the event being played over three days with a 36-hole final.

Players qualify through the Port Phillip Open Amateur, which is played immediately before the championship. The Port Phillip Open Amateur is a 72-hole stroke-play tournament played at Commonwealth and Kingston Heath golf clubs.

History
In 1894 the ladies of the Geelong and Melbourne clubs started an annual "Ladies Championship", to be played alternately on the two courses, the first event to be held at Geelong. The precise status of the event is unclear with some reports calling it the "Ladies' Championship of Victoria" and others the "Ladies' Championship of Australia". These early championships are generally treated as editions of the Australian Women's Amateur. The Australian Golf Union was formed in 1898 and organised their first championship meeting at Royal Sydney in 1899, the main event being the Australian Amateur. The 1899 championship meeting did not include a ladies event but in 1900, when it was held at Adelaide Golf Club, a ladies championship was arranged before the men's event. Evelyn Calder won and some sources referred to her as "the first lady champion of Australia".

The Geelong/Royal Melbourne championship continued to be played and became clearly established as the "Ladies' Championship of Victoria". It was still  played alternately on the two courses but became a stroke-play event, over 54 holes. Nellie De Little won the championship in 1902, 1903 and 1906 with Clare Murphy also a repeat winner, in 1904 and 1905.

The Victorian Ladies' Golf Union was founded in 1906 and took over the event in 1907. It remained a 54-hole stroke play event until 1928 when it switched to match play. The only exception was in 1911 when a 36-hole qualifying stage was used, with the leading eight then playing match play. Nellie Gatehouse won the first VLGU championship in 1907 and also won in 1909, 1910, 1923 and 1927. Gladys Hay won three times, in 1914, 1920 and 1921. Other repeat winners were Edith Raleigh, who won in 1901 and 1912, and Violet Binnie who won in 1911 and 1913. There was only one playoff, in 1914, when Gladys Hay and Eileen Rutledge tied. Hay won an 18-hole playoff the following day.

From 1928 the championship became a match play event, the Australian Women's Amateur also changing the same year. It was initially match play only but 36-hole qualifying was introduced in 1931 with the leading eight advancing to the match play stage. Mona MacLeod won in 1928, the third of her five victories. She also won in 1925, 1926, 1932 and 1933. Susie Tolhurst won in 1929, 1930 and 1931 and, as Mrs Morpeth she won in 1935 and 1936, to match MacLeod's five wins in the championship. Her sister Shirley Tolhurst won in 1934, beating Susie in the final.

Winners

Source:

See also
Victorian Amateur Championship
Australian Women's Interstate Teams Matches

References

External links

Amateur golf tournaments in Australia
Golf in Victoria (Australia)
Recurring sporting events established in 1900
1900 establishments in Australia
Women's golf in Australia